The 1899 VFL Grand Final was an Australian rules football game contested between the Fitzroy Football Club and South Melbourne Football Club, held at the St Kilda Cricket Ground in Melbourne, on 16 September 1899, to determine the premiership team for the 1899 VFL season

It was the second annual Grand Final of the Victorian Football League. The match, attended by 4,823 spectators, was won by Fitzroy by a margin of 1 point, becoming the first club to claim back-to-back VFL premierships.

Lead-up
Fitzroy had won the minor premiership in the 1899 season, while South Melbourne had finished sixth after the home-and-away season. In the sectional rounds, Fitzroy and South Melbourne each finished with records of 3–0 to qualify for the final.

Had South Melbourne won the match, it would not have immediately won the premiership; Fitzroy, as the minor premiers, would have had the right to challenge South to a rematch for the premiership on the following Saturday.

Summary
Despite finishing the home and away season in sixth position, the VFL's new, expanded finals system allowed South Melbourne to make the Grand Final.

The match was played in heavy rain:
"The last match of the season for the league premiership was played on Saturday, when Fitzroy and South Melbourne met on the St. Kilda Cricket Ground.Unfortunately, steady rain, which had fallen all the morning, continued nearly all the afternoon, making the conditions under which the game was played unsatisfactory for the players and most unpleasant for spectators.The "weather committee" had not met to consider the advisability of a postponement, and when the teams assembled South Melbourne suggested deferring the match until next Saturday, but Fitzroy preferred to brave the elements.The assembling of about 4000 spectators in the unfavorable circumstances indicated clearly that, if the weather had kept fine, the attendance would have been enormous.As it was, those present evinced keen interest in the game, every notable bit of good play being heartily cheered.Amongst the onlookers were a number of enthusiasts from Geelong, who came up by special train.[Patrick] McShane had the ground in splendid order until the rain came, and even after the steady downpour, extending over many hours, it played very, much better than could have been expected, reflecting great credit on the experienced and skilful curator.  …Seldom has such a fine game of football been played under such disadvantages …" (The Age, 18 September 1899).

The strong wind from the southern end of the ground favoured South Melbourne in the opening quarter. Harry Lampe kicked the first two goals of the match, and Fitzroy's only score, a behind, came when a kick from Mick Grace hit the post.

Fitzroy then had the advantage of the wind in the second quarter. Goals to Mick Grace and Fred Fontaine had them ahead at half time.

Charlie Colgan gave South Melbourne the lead with the only goal of the third term.

Fitzroy finished strongly. Bill McSpeerin's goal 15 minutes into the final quarter gave Fitzroy the win.

Teams
Fitzroy's Bert Sharpe, the team's centre half-forward in its 1898 premiership side, was a late withdrawal from the side due to the death of his father the day before the Grand Final; his teammates wore black armbands for that match.

 Umpire - Henry "Ivo" Crapp

Statistics

Goalkickers

Attendance
 Junction Oval crowd - 4823

See also
 1899 VFL season

Footnotes

References
 Ross, J. (ed), 100 Years of Australian Football 1897-1996: The Complete Story of the AFL, All the Big Stories, All the Great Pictures, All the Champions, Every AFL Season Reported, Viking, (Ringwood), 1996. 
 The Official statistical history of the AFL 2004

External links
1899 VFL Grand Final statistics

VFL/AFL Grand Finals
Grand
Fitzroy Football Club
Sydney Swans
September 1899 sports events